Inside baseball may refer to:

 Inside baseball (strategy)
 Inside baseball (metaphor)
Inside Baseball, a weekly column in Sports Illustrated